Sofija Gergeležiu (born 31 August 2003) is a Latvian footballer who plays as a defender for RFS and the Latvia national team.

International career
Gergeležiu made her debut for the Latvia national team on 10 June 2021, coming on as a substitute for Anna Krūmiņa against Lithuania.

References

2003 births
Living people
Women's association football defenders
Latvian women's footballers
Latvia women's international footballers
Rīgas FS players